Replacement child is a term used to refer to a child conceived shortly after the parents have lost another child. It was coined by psychologists Albert C. Cain and Barbara S. Cain in 1964.

Since then, people have expanded the definition to include not only a child born shortly after another child dies, but also any child born to replace a child who had died no matter the time frame. Another definition says that a replacement child can also be a child who essentially takes over the role of an older sibling who dies.

In a situation where a child is a replacement child, the parents have not usually moved forward from their other child's death and they are often stuck in the process of grieving.  This replacement child is meant to fill a void that the parents haven't healed from. These parents are survivors of losing a child, but they are often still experiencing a lot of trauma that they are having trouble coping with which results in having this replacement child. This often results in the parents being emotionally unavailable to the new child which results in some problems for that child.  It can result in developmental disturbances and even the child having trouble growing their own identity because they feel like they are living in the shadow of someone else. Parents can lose a child and have another child after without it being considered a replacement child because they have mourned and accepted the loss of their previous child, so the new child isn't “replacing” them.

Many replacement children might not often know that they are a replacement child, due to the idea of a replacement child not being mainstream. Often the children who don't know will struggle with issues, but not be able to place a reason behind it.  When they are able to become more aware of the situation, they are more likely to be able to work through the issues and reframe the situation.

In 1980, clinicians Robert Krell and Leslie Rabkin identified three types of replacement child: the "haunted" child, who lives in a family overwhelmed by guilt and silence, the "bound" child, who is incomparably precious and sometimes over-protected, and the "resurrected" child, who is treated as a reincarnation of the dead sibling. Artists Vincent van Gogh and Salvador Dalí, who both had brothers of the same name who died before their birth, are examples of resurrected children.

Another example of a replacement child is James Barrie who is the author of Peter Pan.  James Barrie was the type of replacement child that took over the role of an older sibling that died.  He was 6 years old when his older brother died at the age of 14.  After the loss of her older child, their mother became depressed, so James began to dress up in his older brother's clothes and even learned to whistle the same way his older brother did in order to gain the attention of this mother.

References 

Psychological theories